Mohamed Zran (born 23 August 1959) is a Tunisian film director and screenwriter. His film Le casseur de pierres was screened in the Un Certain Regard section at the 1990 Cannes Film Festival.

Filmography
 Virgule (1987)
 Le casseur de pierres (1989)
 Ya nabil (1993)
 Essaïda (1996)
 Le chant du millénaire (2002)
 Le prince (2004)

References

External links

1959 births
Living people
Tunisian film directors
Tunisian screenwriters